Herschel Vespasian Johnson (September 18, 1812August 16, 1880) was an American politician. He was the 41st Governor of Georgia from 1853 to 1857 and the vice presidential nominee of the Douglas wing of the Democratic Party in the 1860 U.S. presidential election. He also served as one of Georgia's Confederate States senators.

Early life
Johnson was born near Farmer's Bridge in Burke County, Georgia. In 1834, he graduated from the University of Georgia.  He studied at the private law school of Judge William T. Gould in Augusta, Georgia and was admitted to the bar.

He moved to Jefferson County in 1839 and began to practice law in Louisville, Georgia. In 1844, Johnson moved to the state capitol, Milledgeville, where he continued to practice law. During the 1850s, he would acquire the Samuel Rockwell House, a historic house in the city, as his summer house.

Political life

He unsuccessfully ran for Congress in 1843.  In 1844 he was a presidential elector, and cast his ballot for James K. Polk and George M. Dallas.  He ran unsuccessfully for governor in 1847, and lost the Democratic nomination to George W. Towns; Towns won the general election, and in 1848 he appointed Johnson to the United States Senate seat vacated by the resignation of Walter T. Colquitt. Johnson served from February 4, 1848, to March 3, 1849, but was not a candidate for election to the seat. He returned to Georgia and served as a circuit court judge from 1849 to 1853. In 1853, he was elected Governor of Georgia, then re-elected in 1855. After he finished his term as governor in 1857, Johnson County, Georgia was named in his honor. In 1860, when the Democratic Party refused to add the support of extending slavery to the western territories to its platform, the party split. To try to recapture some southern votes, Johnson was chosen as the northern Democrats' nominee as the running mate of presidential candidate Stephen A. Douglas.

Johnson was a presidential elector in 1852.

He was also a slave owner. In 1840, he owned 34 slaves in Jefferson County, Georgia. In 1850, he owned 7 slaves in Milledgeville, Georgia. He also owned 60 additional slaves in Jefferson County, Georgia. In 1860, he owned 115 slaves in Jefferson County, Georgia.

Civil War
In 1861 he served as a delegate to the state secession convention, and opposed secession from the Union. When it became clear that Georgia would secede, however, he acquiesced out of loyalty to his state and served as a senator of the Second Confederate Congress from 1862 to the end of the war in 1865. In the Confederate Senate, he opposed conscription and the suspension of habeas corpus. After the Civil War, Johnson was a leader in the Reconstruction and was named head of the Georgia constitutional convention. Upon Georgia's readmission to the Union in 1866, he was chosen as a U.S. Senator, but was disallowed from serving due to his allegiance to the Confederate States of America. He again became a circuit court judge in 1873 and served until his death in 1880 in Louisville, Georgia.

See also
 List of signers of the Georgia Ordinance of Secession

References

External links
 Retrieved on 2009-04-24

Clark, Richard H., "Biographical Sketch of Hon. Herschel V. Johnson" Sunny South, June 26, 1875. Digital Library of Georgia.

1812 births
1880 deaths
Confederate States of America senators
19th-century American politicians
Democratic Party United States senators from Georgia (U.S. state)
Democratic Party (United States) vice presidential nominees
Georgia (U.S. state) lawyers
Democratic Party governors of Georgia (U.S. state)
People from Burke County, Georgia
People of Georgia (U.S. state) in the American Civil War
1860 United States vice-presidential candidates
University of Georgia alumni
Signers of the Georgia Ordinance of Secession
People from Louisville, Georgia
People from Milledgeville, Georgia
American slave owners
19th-century American lawyers
1844 United States presidential electors
1852 United States presidential electors
United States senators who owned slaves